The Campbells of Strachur, also known as the MacArthur Campbells of Strachur, may be the oldest branch of the Clan Campbell. The family traces its descent from Sir Arthur Campbell, who is said to have been a son of Duncan Dubh, who in turn may have been an elder brother of Gilleasbaig, who was in turn the father of the patrilineal-ancestor of the chiefs of Clan Campbell. The heads of the Strachur family were known in Gaelic as Mac Artairr, "son of Arthur", in reference to their alleged ancestry. The head of the family bears the Gaelic title MacArtair Strachuirr.

Chiefs of Clan Campbell
The historian William Forbes Skene, who maintained that the Strachur family of Campbells were ancestors of the chiefs of Clan Campbell, writes:

See also
Clan Arthur, the MacArthers of Terivadich are commonly confused with the Campbells of Strachur
John Campbell, of Strachur

References

External links
 http://www.electricscotland.com/webclans/atoc/campbel-a.html
 http://www.ccsna.org/

Clan Campbell
Scottish families
Clan Campbell branches
Strachur